Francesco Maestrelli (born 21 December 2002) is an Italian tennis player.

Maestrelli has a career high ATP singles ranking of world No. 178 achieved on 19 September 2022. He also has a career high ATP doubles ranking of world No. 794 achieved on 18 July 2022.

Maestrelli has won 1 ATP Challenger singles title at the 2022 Internazionali di Tennis Città di Verona.

Challenger and World Tennis Tour Finals

Singles: 4 (3-1)

References

External links
 
 

2002 births
Living people
Sportspeople from Pisa
Italian male tennis players
21st-century Italian people